Jose Punnamparambil is a senior European journalist and translator from Kerala, India. He has been translating Malayalam works into German for 52 years. In 2018, he received Kerala Sahitya Akademi Award for overall contributions to the Malayalam literature.

Biography 
Jose Punnamparambil was born in 1936 May 10, at Edukkalam near Irinjalakkuda in Thrissur district. He immigrated to Germany with a media study scholarship in 1966, after graduating with a degree in English Literature from the University of Mumbai.

While training in social work and journalism, he worked as a government official and college teacher in Mumbai. He worked for five years in Germany as a freelance journalist and has been a member of the advisory board of the Indo-German Society for the past 16 years.

While in Germany, Jose published a Malayalam periodical named Nadan Kath literally meaning local letter. The publication Ente Lokam (Meaning: my world) which he started in 1973 is still being published in Germany as Nammude Lokam (Meaning: our world). He also published German translation of Ente lokam named Mein Welt in 1984.

His contributions include 20 books and documentaries in German and Malayalam. In 2014, Jose made a documentary titled Translated Lives, which chronicles the life of Malayalee nurses who immigrated to Germany from 1960 onwards. This documentary was well received. His documentary Ariyapedatha Jeevithangal (The Unknown Lives) is based on migration of Catholic nuns from Kerala to Germany in the 1970s.

Jose was instrumental in establishing a Malayalam Literary Chair named after Herman Gundert at the University of Tübingen. He studied Malayalam literature for the Nobel Prize Committee and formed the Literature Forum India in Germany.

Family 
He and his wife Sosamma have two children. They lives in Unkel in Germany.

Notable works

Awards and honors 
 Kerala Sahitya Akademi Award for Overall Contributions
 GMF (Global Malayali Federation) Literary Award 2016
 Cross of the Order of Merit of the Federal Republic of Germany 2022

References 

1936 births
People from Thrissur district
Living people
German-language writers
Translators to German
Malayali people
Recipients of the Cross of the Order of Merit of the Federal Republic of Germany